Zophodia asthenosoma is a species of snout moth in the genus Zophodia. It was described by Harrison Gray Dyar Jr. in 1919. It is found in French Guiana.

References

Moths described in 1919
Phycitini